Del Rio, TX 1959 is the debut solo studio album by American country music artist Radney Foster. It was released in 1992 (see 1992 in country music) on the Arista Nashville label, and it produced five singles for Foster on the Billboard country charts: "Just Call Me Lonesome", "Nobody Wins", "Easier Said Than Done", "Hammer and Nails", and "Closing Time". All of these except "Closing Time" were Top 40 hits on the country charts; "Nobody Wins" was the highest-charting, reaching #2.

The album's title refers to Foster's birth year and birthplace.

Track listing

Personnel
The band
 Dan Dugmore – acoustic guitar
 Steve Fishell – pedal steel guitar, lap steel guitar
 Radney Foster – acoustic guitar, lead vocals
 Bill Hullett – electric guitar, acoustic guitar, 6-string bass, mandolin
 Michael Joyce – bass guitar
 Bob Mummert – drums, percussion, tire iron ("Hammer and Nails")
 John Propst – piano
 Pete Wasner – piano, Hammond B-3 organ

Additional musicians
 Glen Duncan – fiddle on "Louisiana Blue" and "Closing Time", viola on "Easier Said than Done"
 Albert Lee – lead guitar on "Don't Say Goodbye" and "Louisiana Blue"
 George Marinelli – lead guitar on "Hammer and Nails" and "A Fine Line"

On "Old Silver"
 Sam Bush – mandolin
 Lee Roy Parnell – National guitar
 Randy Scruggs – guitar
 Harry Stinson – drums
 Glenn Worf – upright bass

Backing vocalists
 Mary Chapin Carpenter – "Nobody Wins"
 John Hiatt – "Hammer and Nails"
 Carl Jackson – "Just Call Me Lonesome", "Louisiana Blue"
 Kim Richey – "Easier Said than Done", "A Fine Line", "Went for a Ride", "Closing Time", "Old Silver"
 Harry Stinson – "Don't Say Goodbye", "Old Silver"
 Cindy Williams – "Closing Time"
 Curtis Young – "A Fine Line", "Closing Time"

Technical
 Chuck Ainlay – mixing (all tracks except "Nobody Wins")
 Randy Best – mixing ("Nobody Wins")
 Steve Fishell – production
 Radney Foster – production
 Mike Poole – recording, mixing ("Old Silver" only)

Chart performance

References

1992 debut albums
Arista Records albums
Radney Foster albums